Petar "Peko" Dapčević (Serbo-Croatian Cyrillic: Петар Пеко Дапчевић; 25 June 1913 – 13 February 1999) was a Yugoslav communist who fought as a volunteer in the Spanish Civil War, joined the Partisan uprising in Montenegro, and became commander of the Yugoslav 1st Proletarian Corps, 1st and 4th Armies.

Dapčević led the Partisan troops that, along with Soviet Red Army under General Vladimir Zhdanov, liberated Belgrade on October 20, 1944. He was the first person to be proclaimed as honorary citizen of Belgrade. He was also among the founders of FK Partizan, the football section of the Partizan Sports Society.

In 1953, Dapčević was named Chief of the Yugoslav General Staff, but was demoted as a result of being indirectly involved in the Milovan Đilas troubles with the party.

Biography
Born in the area of Cetinje known as Ljubotinj, his father Jovan was an Orthodox deacon. He had one sister named Danica who was a public school teacher, and brothers Milutin (an officer in the Royal Yugoslav Army), Dragutin (Major of Yugoslav Armies) and Vlado who was a revolutionary, dissident and anti-revisionist.

Dapčević died at the age of 85 in Belgrade.

References

1913 births
1999 deaths
Military personnel from Cetinje
People of the Kingdom of Montenegro
Yugoslav communists
Montenegrin communists
International Brigades personnel
Yugoslav people of the Spanish Civil War
Yugoslav politicians
Yugoslav Partisans members
Chiefs of Staff of the Yugoslav People's Army
Recipients of the Order of the People's Hero
Generals of the Yugoslav People's Army
Central Committee of the League of Communists of Yugoslavia members
Montenegrin atheists
Military Academy of the General Staff of the Armed Forces of the Soviet Union alumni
Burials at Belgrade New Cemetery
Politicians from Cetinje
Recipients of the Order of the Hero of Socialist Labour